The Chickasha Express Star is a three-day daily newspaper in Chickasha, Oklahoma. It is owned by Community Newspaper Holdings Inc. and also publishes the Oklahoma Extra.

History
Founded in May 1892 as the Chickasha Express., the paper was originally a weekly but moved to daily publication in 1899. It was sold to the Donrey Newspaper chain in 1956. Historical archives are available at the Oklahoma Historical Society.

References

Newspapers published in Oklahoma